Mary Charlotte Wilcox (born October 29, 1947) is a Canadian retired actress and minister.

Early years
Wilcox was born in London, Ontario, and raised there.

Career
Wilcox's most prominent role was as a recurring player in the 5th and 6th seasons of SCTV, 
She has also appeared in the films The Lawyer (1970), Beast of the Yellow Night (1971), Love Me Deadly (1973), Willie Dynamite (1974), Lepke (1975), Psychic Killer (1975), The Big Bus (1976), Black Oak Conspiracy (1977), Improper Channels (1981) and Strange Brew (1983), as well as the TV shows Days of Our Lives, It Takes a Thief, Love, American Style, Mannix (Season 4-Episode 18: "The Crime That Wasn't", as Dorothy Henry), and Maniac Mansion.

After she left acting, Wilcox worked as a secretary in a law office and eventually became a minister in the Anglican Church, serving at St. John the Evangelist Church in Edmonton, Alberta in the early 2000s.

References

External links
 

1947 births
20th-century Canadian actresses
Actresses from Ontario
Canadian film actresses
Canadian television actresses
Living people
People from St. Thomas, Ontario